Wilbrod Humphreys Owor, also Wilbrod Humphrey Owor, is a businessman, bank executive, and management consultant  in Uganda. He is the executive director of Uganda Bankers Association, the umbrella body of Uganda's 25 commercial banks and one development bank. He was appointed to that position on 8 September 2016. He replaced Emmanuel Kikoni, who had served in that capacity from 2000 until 2016.

Background and education
Owor was born in Tororo District in the Eastern Region of Uganda circa 1966. He studied at St. Peter's College Tororo, before he was admitted to Makerere University. He graduated from Makerere with a Bachelor of Commerce, specializing in finance. His Master of Business Administration, specializing in strategic management, was jointly awarded by the Eastern and Southern African Management Institute and the Maastricht School of Management.

Career
Owor has served in several different capacities, including:

 Managing director and chief executive officer of United Bank for Africa (Uganda)
 Head of retail banking at DFCU Bank
 Head of channels at Barclays Bank of Uganda
 Financial controller at Sara Lee (East Africa)
 Head of budget at Colgate Palmolive (East Africa).

In his role at the Uganda Bankers Association, he has begun consultative discussions with stakeholders to seek a solution to the high cost of credit in Uganda. He is also tasked, together with the executive and management teams of the association, with "presenting industry members’ issues to policy makers, making recommendations for policy change and enhancement based on industry trends".

Other responsibilities
Owor is the national chairman of St. Peter's College Old Boys Association

See also
 List of banks in Uganda
 Banking in Uganda

References

External links
 Website of Uganda Bankers Association

Living people

1966 births
Eastern and Southern African Management Institute alumni
Eastern Region, Uganda
Maastricht University alumni
Makerere University alumni
People from Tororo District
Ugandan bankers
Ugandan businesspeople
Ugandan Roman Catholics